Port Norris is an unincorporated community and census-designated place (CDP) located within Commercial Township, in Cumberland County, New Jersey, United States. It is part of the Vineland-Millville- Bridgeton Primary Metropolitan Statistical Area for statistical purposes. As of the 2000 United States Census, the CDP's population was 1,377. Legislation was passed in 1911 allowing voters to choose to incorporate Port Norris as a borough, independent from Commercial Township, but it was defeated in a referendum.

History

On a late night in September 2007, an undercover operation to put a halt to the drag racing was commenced, and up to 62 people were caught participating in a major drag race gathering.  About 208 summonses were issued and several cars were impounded.

Geography
According to the United States Census Bureau, the CDP had a total area of 6.829 square miles (17.685 km2), including 6.335 square miles (16.407 km2) of land and 0.494 square miles (1.279 km2) of water (7.23%). Port Norris is located near the mouth of the Maurice River.

Demographics

Census 2010

Census 2000
As of the 2000 United States Census there were 1,507 people, 514 households, and 380 families residing in the CDP. The population density was 91.3/km2 (236.5/mi2). There were 596 housing units at an average density of 36.1/km2 (93.5/mi2). The racial makeup of the CDP was 58.26% White, 37.09% African American, 0.13% Native American, 0.20% Asian, 1.73% from other races, and 2.59% from two or more races. Hispanic or Latino of any race were 4.64% of the population.

There were 514 households, out of which 30.5% had children under the age of 18 living with them, 49.8% were married couples living together, 18.7% had a female householder with no husband present, and 25.9% were non-families. 20.6% of all households were made up of individuals, and 11.7% had someone living alone who was 65 years of age or older. The average household size was 2.92 and the average family size was 3.36.

In the CDP the population was spread out, with 27.4% under the age of 18, 7.9% from 18 to 24, 27.0% from 25 to 44, 20.8% from 45 to 64, and 16.9% who were 65 years of age or older. The median age was 37 years. For every 100 females, there were 92.0 males. For every 100 females age 18 and over, there were 87.3 males.

The median income for a household in the CDP was $38,194, and the median income for a family was $42,813. Males had a median income of $36,513 versus $22,176 for females. The per capita income for the CDP was $16,195. About 14.0% of families and 16.1% of the population were below the poverty line, including 20.6% of those under age 18 and 7.2% of those age 65 or over.

Education
Students are zoned to Commercial Township School District.

Bivalve and Shell Pile

In the Port Norris area are the communities of Bivalve and Shell Pile. They were both centers of the oystering industry, as their names imply. Shell Pile is described in 1939 excerpt of a WPA Guidebook to New Jersey:

"Shell Pile is named for the great heaps of oyster shells stacked outside the packing sheds. This is a community of about 1,000 Negroes living in wooden barracks erected on stilts over the salt marshes. Negroes here live their own lives in their own way, and present a united and rather hostile front from the rest of the world. Strange whites are not welcomed in Shell Pile."

The oystering industry reached its peak in 1955, declining by 1957 due to oyster pathogen Haplosporidium nelsoni (MSX) which killed 90% of the oysters. Bivalve and Shell Pile are now mostly ghost towns, with a combined population of less than 50.

In Cruising the Chesapeake; a Gunkholer's Guide, William Shellenberger says:

As the name indicates this is an oystering port, probably the busiest on the Delaware. Don't look for typical pleasure-boat facilities - there aren't any. However, you may be able to find dock space on either shore where you can tie up.

References

Census-designated places in Cumberland County, New Jersey
Commercial Township, New Jersey
Ports and harbors of New Jersey